Rhythm, Salt and Pepper (Spanish:Ritmo, sal y pimienta) is a 1951 Argentine musical comedy film directed by Carlos Torres Ríos and starring Lolita Torres, Ricardo Passano and María Esther Gamas.

Cast
 Lolita Torres — Lolita González Torres
 Ricardo Passano — Gerardo
 María Esther Gamas — Renée
 Mario Baroffio — mr. Alejandro González 
 Gogó Andreu — Guillermo 
 Tito Climent — Pablo 
 María Luisa Santés — aunt Aurora 
 Marcos Zucker — Ernesto 
 Alfredo Barbieri — José 
 Susana Vargas
 Olga Gatti 
 Luis Laneri
 Pola Neuman

External links
 

1951 films
1951 musical comedy films
1950s Spanish-language films
Argentine black-and-white films
Argentine musical comedy films
Films directed by Carlos Torres Ríos
1950s Argentine films